Springhill Medical Center is a 270-bed acute care hospital located in the U.S. city of Mobile, Alabama. It is accredited by The Joint Commission. Founded in 1975, the medical center provides full surgical capabilities including open-heart and robotic surgery, complete diagnostic capabilities, heart center, senior residence, sleep medicine center, cancer center, orthopedic surgery center, wound care and hyperbaric center, and an emergency department staffed by all board-certified emergency medicine physicians.

History
Dr. Gerald L. Wallace founded Springhill Memorial Hospital (later renamed Springhill Medical Center) as the first and only private hospital in Mobile, Alabama. It opened on January 10, 1975.

References

External links
 Springhill Medical Center (Official website)

Hospitals in Alabama
1975 establishments in Alabama